Calvin Jones may refer to:

Music
Calvin Jones (composer) (born 1966), American composer
Calvin Jones (musician) (1929–2004), American trombonist, bassist, pianist, bandleader, composer and educator
Calvin "Fuzz" Jones (1926–2010), American blues bassist

Sports
Calvin Jones (cornerback) (born 1951), American football cornerback
Calvin Jones (running back) (born 1970), American football running back
Cal Jones (1933–1956), American football offensive guard
Calvin Jones (baseball) (1963–2022), American baseball pitcher

Others
Calvin Jones (physician) (1775–1846), North Carolina physician and co-founder of the North Carolina Medical Society
Calvin B. Jones (1934–2010), afrocentric visual artist
B. Calvin Jones (1938–1998), American archaeologist

See also